Basilewsky's cranefly (Dicranomyia basilewskyana) is an insect species. It was thought to be extinct for 50 years until 2016, when one landed on an entomologist driving a car in Saint Helena.

References 

Limoniidae
Insects described in 1977